The Louis Delluc Prize is a French film award presented annually since 1937. The award is bestowed to the Best Film and Best First Film of the year on the second week of each December. The jury is composed of 20 members, consisting of a group of film critics and figures who are culturally significant. Gilles Jacob is the president. The meeting is at le Fouquet's restaurant  in Champs-Élysées.

The award was created in 1937 in view of the decision of the Académie française to award its Grand Prix du Cinema to films that were created by French filmmakers. Twenty-four film critics including Maurice Bessy and Marcel Idzkowski established the prize to honor Louis Delluc (1890–1924), the first French journalist to specialize in cinema and founder of the ciné-clubs.

Notes
≠ Oscar winner
± Oscar nominee
≈ Palme d'Or winner

Winners

Louis Delluc Prize for Best Film

1930s

1940s

1950s

1960s

1970s

1980s

1990s

2000s

2010s

2020s

Louis Delluc Prize for Best First Film

1990s

2000s

2010s

2020s

Jury

1937 edition 
Maurice Bessy
Pierre Bost
Georges Charensol
Nino Franck
Marcel Idzkowski
Roger Régent

References

External links 
 
 Louis Delluc Prize at AlloCiné
BBC podcast reviews of selected Louis Delluc Prize-winning films

Louis-Delluc

Awards established in 1937
1937 establishments in France